Groundwork was laid for the launch of the first artificial satellite with the scheduling of the International Geophysical Year for 1957-58. This scientific endeavor would involve dozens of nations in a global investigation of physical phenomenona, on the ground and in space.

In 1952, all branches of the United States' military, often in partnership with civilian organizations, continued their program of sounding rocket research beyond the  boundary of space (as defined by the World Air Sports Federation) using the Aerobee rocket. The University of Iowa launched its first series of rockoon flights, demonstrating the validity of the balloon-launched rocket. The launch of Viking 9 at the end of the year by the Naval Research Laboratory team under the management of Milton Rosen represented the pinnacle of contemporary operational rocket design.

The year saw no new ballistic missiles added to the arsenals of either the United States or the Soviet Union. However, work continued apace on large rocket development, particularly of the US Army's Redstone and the Soviet R-5 missile.

Space exploration highlights

US Navy

In the late spring of 1952, the Naval Research Laboratory team under the management of Milton Rosen prepared to launch the first second-generation Viking rocket, Viking 8, from White Sands Missile Range in New Mexico. The new Viking design was nearly half-again as wide as its precursor, affording the highest fuel-to-weight ratio of any rocket yet developed. The tail fins no longer supported the weight of the rocket, has had previously been the case. Now, the Viking rocket rested on the base of its fuselage. This allowed the tail fins to be made much lighter, one of many ways the Viking was redesigned to carry a heavier tank without weighing more than the first Viking design.

On 6 June 1952, Viking 8 broke loose of its moorings during a static firing test. After it was allowed to fly for 55 seconds in the hope that it would clear the immediate area and thus pose no danger to ground crew, Nat Wagner, head of the "Cutoff group" delivered a command to the rocket to cease its thrust. 65 seconds later, the rocket crashed  or  downrange to the southeast.

With lessons learned from the Viking 8 failure, the successful 9 December static firing of Viking 9 was followed on 15 December by a successful launch from White Sands. In addition to cameras that photographed the Earth during flight, Viking 9 carried a full suite of cosmic ray, ultraviolet, and X-ray detectors, including sixteen plates of emulsion gel for tracking the path of individual high energy particles. The experiment package was recovered intact after it had secured measurements high above the Earth's atmosphere.

American civilian efforts

1952 saw the first rockoon flights. These balloon-mounted rockets were significantly cheaper than sounding rocket flights: $1800 (equivalent to $) per launch versus $25,000 ($) for each Aerobee launch and $450,000 ($) for each Viking launch.

Spacecraft development

US Air Force

Progress remained slow throughout 1952 on the Atlas, the nation's first ICBM, the contract for which had been awarded to Consolidated Vultee in January 1951 by the US Air Force's Air Research and Development Command. Conservative development policies and daunting technical problems were the official causes, but the Air Forces's apparent lack of enthusiasm for project, along with the constraint of limited budget and resources, were factors as well. It was not until the first successful H-bomb test at Elugelab in November 1952 that the Atlas, potentially capable of delivering such a weapon, garnered more support.

US Army

On 8 April 1952, the surface-to-surface missile being developed by Redstone Arsenal in Alabama since 10 July 1951, officially received the name "Redstone".

Soviet military

The R-5, the conceptual design of which had been completed by 30 October 1951, superseded the ambitious  range R-3, which had been canceled on 20 October 1951

The USSR's "first Soviet strategic rocket," as the R-5 was thenceforth known, was an incremental improvement on the R-1 and R-2 rockets with not only increased range but improved accuracy. Its propellant tanks were integral to the rocket, reducing structural weight and allowing for more fuel. Two of the first ten R-5s produced underwent stand tests through February 1952, and the sleek, cylindrical R-5 would be ready for its first launch March 1953.

Also in 1952, the design bureau OKB-486 under Valentin Glushko began developing the RD-105 and RD-106 engines for an even more powerful rocket: the five engine R-6 ICBM. Using an integrated solder-welded configuration, developed by engineer Aleksei Isaev, these LOX/kerosene engines would be more powerful single chamber engines than those used in earlier rockets. Four  RD-105 would power the R-6's four strap-on engines while a  RD-106 would power the central booster.

That same year, there was also a series of fourteen test launches of the mass-produced version of R-2 missile (range of ). Twelve of the missiles reached their targets. The R-1 also was test-launched seven times.

Civilian efforts

In October 1952, the General Assembly of the International Council of Scientific Unions (ICSU) adopted a proposal to undertake simultaneous observations of geophysical phenomena over the entire surface of the Earth. The International Geophysical Year (IGY), set for 1957-58, would involve the efforts of a multitude of nations in such farflung regions as the Arctic and Antarctica. To coordinate this massive effort, the ICSU formed the Comité Speciale de l'Année Géophysique Internationale (CSAGI), which would hold four major meetings with representation from all participating countries over the next four years.

In part inspired by lectures he gave to the British Interplanetary Society in London the previous year, the University of Maryland's Fred Singer began espousing in both print and in public presentations the use of small artificial satellites to conduct scientific observations. This concept was dubbed "MOUSE" (Minimum Orbiting Unmanned Satellite of the Earth) and was dismissed by many as too radical and/or in conflict with human exploration of space. Nevertheless, the proposal catalyzed serious discussion of the use of satellites for scientific research.

Launches

January

|}

February

|}

April

|}

May

|}

June

|}

August

|}

September

|}

October

|}

November
-

|}

December

|}

Suborbital launch summary

By country

By rocket

See also
Timeline of spaceflight

References

Footnotes

1952 in spaceflight
Spaceflight by year